The lowermost Upper Devonian fossil Pallaviciniites was for a time the oldest known liverwort until Metzgeriothallus was recovered from earlier Devonian strata.

It had a central axis, and bifurcated at its tips; similar fossils have been found in younger strata through to the Pleistocene.  With the exception of its elongated axial conducting (non-vascular) cells, the thallus was a single cell thick. It had a serrated margin.

Prior to its discovery, the oldest known liverworts dated to the Lower Carboniferous.

References

Metzgeriales
Late Devonian plants
Frasnian life
Prehistoric plant genera
Liverwort genera